Thailand was the host nation for the 2014 Asian Beach Games held in Phuket from 14 to 23 November 2014.

Competitors

Medal summary

Medal by sport

Medal by Date

External links 
Official Site
Tournament Summary of Thailand

References 

Nations at the 2014 Asian Beach Games
2014
Asian Beach Games